Blue Latitudes: Boldly Going Where Captain Cook Has Gone Before (United States), or Into the Blue: Boldly Going Where Captain Cook Has Gone Before (Australia), is a travel book by Tony Horwitz, published in 2002.

In it, the Pulitzer Prize–winning journalist travels to various parts of the world, following in the footsteps of explorer James Cook. The book compares the current conditions of the places Cook visited to what Cook documented at the time, and describes the different legacies Cook has left behind.

Horowitz begins with his experience as a volunteer deckhand on the replica of HM Bark Endeavour. Some of the places Horowitz visits in his travels include Australia, the small island nation of Niue, the Society Islands, Tonga, New Zealand, the birthplace and home of Cook in North Yorkshire England, Alaska, and Hawaii.

References

External links
Presentation by Horwitz on Blue Latitudes, October 13, 2002
 
 BLUE LATITUDES: Boldly Going Where Captain Cook Has Gone Before by Tony Horwitz | Read by Daniel Gerroll Contemporary Culture • 9 hrs. • Abridged • © 2002] 
2002 non-fiction books
Books about Oceania
Henry Holt and Company books
James Cook
American travel books
American history books